Martin Špinar (born 1 December 1972) is a retired Czech football defender.

References

1972 births
Living people
Czech footballers
FC Zbrojovka Brno players
AFK Atlantic Lázně Bohdaneč players
1. FK Příbram players
Czechoslovak First League players
Czech First League players
Association football defenders
Footballers from Brno